This is a list of public statues of individuals linked to the Atlantic slave trade.

United Kingdom

Commission for Diversity in the Public Realm
In June 2020 the Mayor of London, Sadiq Khan, established the Commission for Diversity in the Public Realm to "review and improve diversity across London's public realm to ensure the capital's landmarks suitably reflect London's achievements and diversity". Khan said "When you look at the public realm – street names, street squares, murals – not only are there some of slavers that I think should be taken down, and the commission will advise us on that, but actually we don’t have enough representation of people of colour, black people, women, those from the LGBT community."

Khan also announced a pledge to create a National Slavery museum or memorial.

Channel Islands

See also
Atlantic slave trade
Iconoclasm

References

Further reading

External links
https://www.thetimes.co.uk/article/84-of-black-britons-reject-toppling-statues-w2v5hf9f8

Public art
Works about slavery
Statues by subject
Statues in England
African slave trade
Black British history
Forced migration
History of English colonialism
Slavery in the British Empire
British slave traders
Statues
Lists of statues